Music Break was a Canadian music variety and talk show television series which aired on CBC Television from 1960 to 1962.

Premise
This Winnipeg-produced series was hosted by Georges LaFleche who received such guests as Gene Kiniski and Gordon Pinsent. Each week a female singer was included on the broadcasts. Bob McMullin conducted the series orchestra.

Scheduling
This first season of this half-hour series was broadcast Tuesdays at 3:00 p.m. (Eastern) from 18 October to 27 June 1961. The second season was broadcast Wednesdays at 3:00 p.m. from 4 October 1961 to 29 June 1962.

References

External links
 

CBC Television original programming
1960 Canadian television series debuts
1962 Canadian television series endings